The following is a list of United Kingdom, Christmas television specials, as well as Christmas-themed episodes of regular television series.

Drama

BBC

All Creatures Great and Small

Call the Midwife

Casualty / Holby City

Doctor Who

Father Brown

Grange Hill

Jonathan Creek

ITV

Bad Girls

The Darling Buds of May

Downton Abbey

The Bill

Heartbeat / The Royal

Midsomer Murders

Northern Lights

Taggart

Upstairs, Downstairs

Channel 4

Channel 5

Comedies

BBC

2point4 Children

After You've Gone

'Allo 'Allo!

Are You Being Served?

Birds of a Feather

Bread

The Brittas Empire

The Catherine Tate Show

Citizen Khan

Citizen Smith

Dad's Army

The Detectives

dinnerladies

Happy Ever After / Terry and June

Insert Name Here

Keeping Up Appearances

Last of the Summer Wine

Live at the Apollo

Miranda

Mock the Week

Horrid Henry

Mr. Bean (animated TV series)

My Parents Are Aliens

Thomas the Tank Engine and Friends

Thomas and Friends

Channel 5's Milkshake!

Peppa Pig

Ben & Holly's Little Kingdom

Fireman Sam

Thomas and Friends

Thomas and Friends: Big World! Big Adventures!

S4C

Netflix

Others

Gerry Anderson productions
Sometimes repeated on BBC One, but was originally shown on ITV.

Raymond Briggs Adaptations
Usual shown on Channel 4.

Specials
 Ant & Dec Saturday Night Takeaway at Christmas (2005)
 Ant & Dec's Christmas Show (2009)
 The Funny Side of Christmas (1982)
 Greatest Christmas Comedy Moments (2008)
 Oz and Hugh Drink to Christmas (2009)
 The Real Hustle: The 12 Scams of Christmas (2006)
 Ruth Jones Christmas Cracker (2009–present)
 The Gadget Man Guide to Christmas (2014)
 A Christmas Cracker (2014)

Top Gear

Misc
 Channel 4's Alternative Christmas message (1993 – present)
 Midnight Mass (1960 – present) – Every year Christmas morning starts on BBC with Midnight Mass for Catholic faiths.
 The Royal Institution Christmas Lectures (1966 – present). Note: The Royal Institution Christmas Lectures have been going since 1825 but started being broadcast in 1966.
 The Royal Christmas Message (1957–1968, 1970 – present). Note: The Royal Christmas message has been read as far back as King George V in 1932 & 1935 over the radio, and then George VI in 1939, 1941–1942, 1945–1946, 1949 and 1951 up until Queen Elizabeth II read it on the radio from 1952 to 1956. It wasn't until 1957 that the event was televised.
 Songs of Praise (1961 – present) – Every year songs of Praise celebrates advent Sunday's leading up to Christmas.
 Text Santa (2011-2015)
 Star Over Bethlehem (1977, 1979, 1981) - A live satellite transmission that featured Christmas music from around the world.  USA contributions included remotes from a shopping mall in Columbia, South Carolina and the CBN studios in Virginia Beach, Virginia.

See also
 Christmas in the media
 List of Doctor Who Christmas and New Year's specials 
 List of Christmas television specials
 List of United States Christmas television episodes
 List of United States Christmas television specials
 List of A Christmas Carol adaptations
 List of Christmas films
 List of Made-for-Television and Direct-To-Video Christmas films
 Christmas music
 List of Halloween television specials
 List of Thanksgiving television specials
 Lists of television specials

References

 
 
Christmas in the United Kingdom
Lists of television specials
Television United Kingdom